Gary Thompson (born 31 May 1992 in Dublin, Ireland) is an Irish racecar driver. He very briefly raced with the Romeo-Ferraris team in FIA European Formula 3 Championship but departed the squad after just two rounds under mysterious circumstances.

Thompson is believed to have started racing in karts in 2003, finishing a handsome 5th in the Cadet Irish Championship. In 2009 Thompson raced in the Formula BMW Pacific Championship stylishly winning the opening race at the Sepang International Circuit, Malaysia. In total Thompson had 11 podiums and finished second in the championship, winning the coveted Rookie of the Year Cup.

References

External links
 
 

1992 births
Living people
Sportspeople from County Dublin
Irish racing drivers
Formula BMW Pacific drivers
Japanese Formula 3 Championship drivers
FIA Formula 3 European Championship drivers
Asian Le Mans Series drivers
KCMG drivers
Motopark Academy drivers
German Formula Three Championship drivers
Double R Racing drivers
Formula BMW Europe drivers